The Ellesmere Canal was a waterway in England and Wales that was planned to carry boat traffic between the rivers Mersey and Severn. The proposal would create a link between the Port of Liverpool and the mineral industries in north east Wales and the manufacturing centres in the West Midlands. However, the canal was never completed as intended because of its rising costs and failure to generate the expected commercial traffic.

The Ellesmere Canal, which was first proposed in 1791, would have created a waterway between Netherpool, Cheshire, and Shrewsbury. However, only certain sections were completed; these were eventually incorporated into the Chester Canal, Montgomery Canal and Shropshire Union Canal. Although several major civil engineering feats were accomplished, major building work ceased following the completion of the Pontcysyllte Aqueduct in 1805.

As part of the rebranding of Britain's industrial waterways as leisure destinations, the surviving central section is now called the Llangollen Canal; even though historically its builders had no intention of sending boat traffic to Llangollen. The branch, from which the waterway now takes its name, was primarily a water feeder from the River Dee above the village. Therefore it was not built as a broad-gauge canal, hence its inherently narrow design.

History

Route planning

The formal proposal for the canal was launched at a meeting in Ellesmere in 1791 for a canal from Netherpool (now Ellesmere Port) on the River Mersey to the River Dee at Chester. It would then go in a south easterly direction via Overton (south of Wrexham) to the River Severn at Shrewsbury. Branches would then be cut to the iron making and coal mining areas at Bersham between Wrexham and Ruabon and to the copper mines at Llanymynech. By 1793 an Act of Parliament had been passed allowing the Ellesmere Canal company to build the canal.

However this route of the canal beyond Chester was not to the liking of all backers. They wanted the canal's course to follow a more westerly route from the Dee to the Severn passing directly through the Welsh mining areas. Eventually this proposal was the one that canal engineer John Duncombe followed when he eventually surveyed the route. Notable civil engineer William Jessop was called into advise; he too recommended the route surveyed by Duncombe. Jessop was eventually appointed the project's engineer while Thomas Telford was appointed as General Agent. The northernmost section, a contour canal, from the Mersey to the Dee was completed in 1797. This allowed the company to generate revenue from tolls to help finance construction of the rest of the canal.

However the westerly route posed formidable engineering obstacles. Close to the Eglwyseg and Ruabon mountains, there were deep river valleys to be crossed and high ground to be tunnelled.

A plan of the canal, published in 1795, showed the route between Netherpool in the north to Shrewsbury to the south: 
River Mersey; Great Stanney; Stoak; Wervin; Caughall; Chester; Saltneyside; Lache Hall; Rough Hill; Cuckoos Nest; Wrexham; Ruabon; Plas Madoc; Chirk; Hordley; Dandyford; Shade Oak; Weston Lullingfields; Eyton; Walford; Hancott; Shrewsbury; River Severn.
The canal plan would also have four branches:
A  branch would run to Holt.
A  branch would run from near Wrexham to Brymbo.
A branch would run from near Hordley to Llanymynech, via Maesbury, Morton and Crickheath.
A  branch would run from near Tetchill to Prees Heath, via Welshampton, Fenn's Moss and Whitchurch.

Originally Jessop had suggested that the cheaper solution was to use locks on both sides of Vale of Llangollen to take the canal down to a more manageable height for the second, upstream crossing of the River Dee at Froncysyllte. Rather than crossing at full height, the locks would reuse water by backpumping. But by 1795 Jessop and Telford had changed their decision. Instead they developed a proposal for a cast-iron aqueduct to maintain the original level.

Construction

In 1796 the Llanymynech Branch was opened, linking the main line at Frankton Junction with Llanymynech. This joined the Montgomeryshire Canal at Carreghofa Locks when the Montgomeryshire opened in 1797.

In 1796, Thomas Telford constructed a feeder reservoir lake in Moss Valley, Wrexham to provide water to the length of canal between Trevor Basin and Chester. However, as the plan to build this section was cancelled in 1798, the isolated feeder and a stretch of navigation between Ffrwd and a basin in Summerhill was abandoned. Remnants of the feeder channel are visible in Gwersyllt. A street in the village is still named Heol Camlas (Canal Way).

The contour section from the River Mersey to the River Dee at Chester was joined to the Chester Canal in 1797.

On the main line section, the Chirk Aqueduct was opened in 1801, and Pontcysyllte Aqueduct in 1805. However, by this time the proposed line from the Dee at Chester to Ruabon had been abandoned as uneconomic.

Also abandoned was the plan to reach the Severn, as the Shrewsbury Canal was already serving the town, and the poor navigational state of the Severn meant that additional traffic would not justify the cost of the building works.

As the canal would now not reach its proposed main source of water northwest of Wrexham, a feeder was constructed along the side of the Dee valley to Horseshoe Falls at Llantysilio. This narrow feeder branch was made navigable, allowing boats to reach Llangollen.

In the end the only parts of the main line of the canal to be built was the extreme northern line from the Mersey to Chester and the  central section from Trevor Basin to Weston Lullingfields. As this left the middle part isolated from the rest of the UK waterways network, the planned Whitchurch branch was re-routed. A  link was built from Frankton via Ellesmere to the Chester Canal at Hurleston Junction in sections between 1797 and 1806. Despite the circuitous route, it was considered to be the main line. The extension also included an arm to Whitchurch because the town had been by-passed by the new route.
A branch was also originally intended to reach Prees in Shropshire; however the line was only constructed as far as Quina Brook,  from the village.

The section of waterway from Frankton Junction to Weston Lullingfields, which was originally intended to be the main line to Shrewsbury, became the Weston Branch.

Working canal
Due to the constraints placed on the canal by its incomplete design, the Ellesmere Canal struggled financially throughout its operating life as an industrial waterway. In 1813, the Ellesmere Canal company merged with the Chester Canal to form the Ellesmere and Chester Canal Company. This business was then merged with the Birmingham and Liverpool Junction Canal in 1845. A year later the canal was taken over again by the formation of the Shropshire Union Railways and Canal Company.

By 1917 the Weston Branch had closed following a breach near Hordley Wharf. In 1939 traffic on the line from Hurleston to Llangollen had all but ceased. All remaining parts of the Ellesmere Canal network, other than the northern line from Ellesmere Port to Chester, was closed to navigation by Act of Parliament in 1944. However, the canal from Hurleston to Llangollen was retained as a water feeder for the Shropshire Union Canal main line and for drinking water. In 1955 an agreement with the Mid & South East Cheshire Water Board secured the canal's future.

Present day
Despite the formal closure, increasing popularity of the canal with pleasure boats led to its acceptance as an important amenity, and the rebranding as the Llangollen Canal. As the canal was never intended to go to Llangollen, this renaming is an ironic twist symbolic of the canal's convoluted development.

The Ellesmere Canal south of Frankton Junction (the Llanymynech Branch) nowadays forms part of the Montgomery Canal, together with the Montgomeryshire Canal, and the isolated northern section from Chester to Ellesmere Port considered part of the main line of the Shropshire Union Canal.

The Weston Branch is now infilled, save for a very short section, which has a Canal & River Trust amenity block.

Route

Ellesmere Port to Chester

The canal starts at Ellesmere Port Dock by the Mersey. Originally goods would be transferred directly from inland waterways craft into river-going vessels at the dock, which would enter and exit through tidal lock gates. However, in the 1890s, with the construction of the Manchester Ship Canal, the basin became detached from the river. Traffic was controlled by a set of two-lock staircases.

A contour canal runs between Ellesmere Port and Chester following the course of a natural river valley that encompasses Backford Brook and the Bache valley. The canal enters Chester Basin (wharf) at the junction with the Chester Canal. At this point, there is also a 4-lock branch that once led down to the River Dee and Port of Chester.

When the Ellesmere Canal reached the Chester Canal, the configuration of the staircase locks at Chester was altered. The original 5-lock staircase was replaced by a deeper three-lock arrangement. At this point, the section is now part of the Shropshire Union Canal.

Hurleston to Frankton Junction

This section was added to link the canal to the national network. It became the Ellesmere Branch of the Shropshire Union Canal and is now part of the Llangollen Canal.

Frankton Junction to Trevor Basin

This was the principal part of the original main line of the canal. It became the Llangollen Branch of the Shropshire Union Canal and is now part of the Llangollen Canal.

Trevor Basin to Horseshoe Falls

This section of the canal was added as a navigable feeder. It is now part of the Llangollen Canal.

Frankton Junction to Llanymynech

This section (the Llanymynech Branch) is now designated as part of the Montgomery Canal (combining the Llanymynech Branch of the Ellesmere Canal with the Montgomeryshire Canal). The section from Frankton Junction to the Weston Branch was originally intended to be the main line of the canal. Bridge numbering (which starts at Hurleston Junction) continues down the Llanymynech Branch, and despite now being regarded as two separate canals (the Llangollen and the Montgomery) this numbering scheme remains.

Frankton Junction to Weston Lullingfields

This section was originally intended to be the main line of the canal, and is now infilled. The  arm had wharves at Hordley, Dandyford, Pedlar's Bridge, Shade Oak and Weston Lullingfields. At Weston Lullingfields the canal company built a wharf, four lime kilns, a public house, stables, a clerk's house and weighing machine. These were opened in 1797 and closed in 1917 when the Weston branch was closed following a breach of the canal.

See also

Canals of Great Britain
History of the British canal system

References

 Todd, John (2003) "A canal of many parts", Waterways world, 32 (2: Feb.), p. 46–49 & (3: Mar.), p. 48–51.
 Wilson, Edward A. (1975) The Ellesmere and Llangollen Canal : an historical background, London : Phillimore, 
 
 

 
Canals linked to the River Severn
Canals in Shropshire
History of Shropshire
Canals in Cheshire
History of Cheshire
Works of Thomas Telford
Shropshire Union Canal
Canals opened in 1806
Cancelled projects in Wales